Presente (English: Gift) is the fourth solo album by Brazilian singer-songwriter Renato Russo, and his second posthumous one, released in March 2003, seven years after his death.

Background 
Journalist and producer Marcelo Fróes searched Russo's personal archives and EMI's collection, willing to find anything that could be used for an album or something like that. Before he finished his work, he was summoned by the label to propose some release and he suggested using rarities left by Russo.

It was something similar to a project that Reginaldo Ferreira, a former roadie of Russo's main band Legião Urbana and his personal friend, had presented to Jorge Davidson (the label's artistic manager), but had been rejected. Davidson ended up planning the album alone, without consulting Fróes. The journalist then demanded to be credited as the project's conceiver and executive producer, besides deciding the order of the songs so they would be just like he envisioned. Davidson accepted and was credited as artistic manager on "Mais Uma Vez", "Hoje" and "Boomerang Blues".

Repertoire and curation 
Fróes found part of the songs on house made recordings by Russo, such as "Hoje" (a duet with Leila Pinheiro), "Boomerang Blues" (written by him and recorded by Barão Vermelho) and "Thunder Road" (a cover of American singer Bruce Springsteen).

Previously released songs were also included, such as "A Cruz e a Espada" (duet with Paulo Ricardo, ex-RPM), "A Carta" (duet with Erasmo Carlos), "Quando Eu Estiver Cantando" (a Cazuza cover originally recorded live for Viva Cazuza, a special show that took place in October 1990, three months after his death and that continues into a cover of "Endless Love") and "Gente Humilde" (duet with acoustic guitarist Hélio Delmiro, recorded for 1993's Songbook Vinícius de Moraes vol. 3, a project celebrating Vinicius de Moraes 90th birthday prepared by Almir Chediak). "A Cruz e a Espada" was later released as a duet in Ricardo's 1996 solo album Rock Popular Brasileiro.

"Cathedral Song / Catedral" is a special mix of "Cathedral Song" (cover lof Tanita Tikaram) and "Catedral" (another version, but sung in Portuguese by Zélia Duncan). The idea came from Victor Kelly, from EMI's marketing department.

"Mais Uma Vez", written by Russo and Flávio Venturini and recorded by 14 Bis (of which Venturini was a member) in 1987, was the big bet of the label concerning this album. A new version of the song was created, using only Russo's voice. It would become the album's main single and was featured on the telenovela Mulheres Apaixonadas (aired by Rede Globo in 2003) soundtrack. The original version was remixed and included on the album.

"Hoje" was shelved for many years. Leila Pinheiro was a Legião Urbana fan and included "Tempo Perdido" in her repertoire. One day, she paid Russo a visit in Ilha do Governador to ask for permission to record the track on her third album, Alma (1988), and both became friends since that moment.

Later, when Russo was already aware of his HIV-positive condition, he showed Pinheiro the lyrics to "Hoje" and asked her to play it on the piano inn a bossa nova style. The lyrics expressed a wish for more time – back then, Pinheiro wasn't aware of Russo's condition and didn't get the song's message. Never again did she have access to the tape Russo recorded until Fróes recovered it and producer Nilo Romero invited her to sing the final version.

"Boomerang Blues" was composed during Russo's "O Trovador Solitário" (The Lonely Troubador) era. The version featured on this album received a new arrangement that kept Russo's voice and acoustic guitar and added a dobro and a harmonica by producer Nilo Romero. In 2017, it was featured in another Globo telenovela, this time as the opening theme of O Outro Lado do Paraíso. Barão Vermelho covered it for their album Declare Guerra.

Presente still had some gaps by the end of the agreed production period – December 2002 – February 2003 – because the label couldn't negotiate with all involved parts in time. Some of these missing parts (namely duets with Dorival Caymmi and Adriana Calcanhotto) ended up used in a future Renato Russo solo release, Duetos. To fill in these gaps, some interviews Russo had given to José Maurício Machline, from International Magazine, were used.

Title 
The album's title was proposed by lawyer Silvia Gandelman, since it would be released on Russo's birthday.

Track list

Personnel 
According to Fuscaldo 2016, pp. 189–190.

 Renato Russo – vocals on all tracks, acoustic guitar on "Bomerang Blues", "Thunder Road"
 Moska – twelve-string guitar on "Mais Uma Vez"
 Billy Brandão – guitar on "Mais Uma Vez"
 Nilo Romero – dobro and harmonica on "Boomerang Blues", bass guitar and steel acoustic guitar on "Mais Uma Vez"
 Sacha Amback – keyboards on "Mais Uma Vez"
 Jongui – drums on "Mais Uma Vez"

Technical personnel 
 Marcelo Fróes – conceiver and executive producer
 Jorge Davidson – artistic manager on "Mais Uma Vez", "Hoje" and "Boomerang Blues"
 Nilo Romero – producer on "Mais Uma Vez", "Hoje" and "Boomerang Blues"
 Gabriela Azevedo – Romero's assistant on "Mais Uma Vez", "Hoje" and "Boomerang Blues"
 Loup De Ville – Pro Tools operator on "Cathedral Song / Catedral"

Notes

References 

 

2003 albums
Renato Russo albums